Sebastian Dahlström (born 5 November 1996) is a Finnish football player who plays for KuPS.

Career

Club
On 18 December 2019, Sheriff Tiraspol announced that Dahlström would join the club on 20 January 2020. In 2021 he made a one-season contract with his old club HJK.

On 10 December 2021, he signed a two-year contract with KuPS.

International
Dahlström made his debut for the Finland national football team on 8 January 2019 in a friendly against Sweden, as a half-time substitute for Tim Sparv.

Career statistics

Club

International

Statistics accurate as of match played 11 January 2019

Honours
Individual
Veikkausliiga Team of the Year: 2018

References

  Profile at veikkausliiga.com

External links
 Sebastian Dahlström at HJK 
 

1996 births
Living people
Finnish footballers
Helsingin Jalkapalloklubi players
FC Sheriff Tiraspol players
Kuopion Palloseura players
Veikkausliiga players
Kakkonen players
Moldovan Super Liga players
Footballers from Helsinki
Swedish-speaking Finns
Association football midfielders
Finland international footballers
Finnish expatriate footballers
Expatriate footballers in Moldova
Finnish expatriate sportspeople in Moldova
21st-century Finnish people